"Picture to Burn"  is a song by American singer-songwriter Taylor Swift, taken from her self-titled debut studio album (2006). Swift and Liz Rose wrote the track, which was produced by Nathan Chapman. The song was released as the album's fourth single on February 4, 2008, by Big Machine Records. For the lyrics, which narrate a protagonist's contempt for an ex-lover, Swift was inspired by the narcissistic and cocky nature of a high-school classmate. Musically, the country rock track features prominent plunking banjo and distorted guitars.

The original album version of "Picture to Burn" contained the lyric, "That's fine; I'll tell mine you're gay", which was modified to "That's fine; You won't mind if I say", on the radio edit and subsequent versions. Music critics praised the song's production and lyrics for earnestly depicting teenage feelings. In the United States, the single peaked at number 28 on the Billboard Hot 100 and number three on Hot Country Songs, and was certified double platinum by the Recording Industry Association of America (RIAA). It peaked within the top 50 in Canada, where it was certified gold.

The music video for "Picture to Burn" was directed by Trey Fanjoy and features Swift fantasizing about taking revenge on her ex-boyfriend after she discovers him with another woman. The video has Swift and her band performing with pyrotechnics as a backdrop. Swift performed "Picture to Burn" live as an opening act to other country-music artists' tours, and included it in the set list of her first headlining tour, the Fearless Tour (2009–10).

Background and release
Swift was inspired to write "Picture to Burn" by an informal boyfriend from high school; both Swift and the boy were classmates at Hendersonville High School in Tennessee. She found him narcissistic and cocky, which frustrated her, and channeled this feeling through her after-school songwriting. Liz Rose co-wrote the song on guitar, and Swift gave it a comedic edge, exclaiming to herself, "I hate his stupid truck that he doesn't let me drive. He's such a redneck! Oh my God!", a line that was ultimately developed into the chorus. Speaking of "Picture to Burn", Swift described it as brutally honest and cited it as an example of how she expressed her feelings towards those who wronged her. She said it was the only song driven by anger on her self-titled debut album (2006) and that it was a topic she felt most teenage females could relate to. After Swift performed "Picture to Burn" at concerts throughout 2006–2007, she decided to pick it as a single because the crowd seemed to be the most enthusiastic with most screaming it "at the top of their lungs".

In retrospect, Swift stated that the song was something typical of her to say in her teenage years and that it exemplified how she processed emotion at the time, "I didn't know anything then." She explained, "I had this song called 'Picture to Burn,' that's talking about how 'I hate your truck,' and 'I hate that you ignored me,' 'I hate you.' Now, the way that I would say that and the way that I would feel that kind of pain is a lot different." Despite her evolving on a personal level and as a songwriter, she claimed not to be regretful of "Picture to Burn", rather happy she was able to demonstrate "those emotions that when you're so angry, you hate everything. It's like recording your diary over the years, and that's a gift", she said. "Picture to Burn" was released to US country radio as the fourth single from Taylor Swift on February 3, 2008, by Big Machine Records. It was released to US contemporary hit radio on July 15, 2008, by Big Machine and Republic Records.

Composition

"Picture to Burn" is a country song with a length of two minutes and 55 seconds. It draws influences from traditional elements of country music, resulting in an uptempo country rock number. Written in the key of G major, the song is set in common time and has a tempo of 106 beats per minute with a strong beat. Swift's boasts with "big vocals" that span two octaves, from the note of G3 to C5. It follows the chord progression G–Am7–C–D. The verses are driven by banjos and drums, meanwhile the refrains' instrumentation is marked by distorted guitars.

Lyrically, "Picture to Burn" is an evisceration of a no-good adolescent male, and is directed towards an ex-boyfriend. The narrator ridicules the ex-boyfriend's love for pickup trucks and threatens to date all of his friends. About the song's theme, Sean Dooley of About.com commented, "Swift takes no prisoners in her quest to make a former flame feel her wrath for doing her wrong." In the first verse, Swift introduces relationship by stating she acknowledged the fact that her former boyfriend was more in love with himself than with her. The second verse has Swift plotting retaliation: "There's no time for tears / I'm just sitting here planning my revenge / There's nothing stopping me / From goin' out with all of your best friends." For the refrains, she speaks of setting fire to photographs of her ex-boyfriend, concluding them with a musical punch line, "As far as I'm concerned / You're just another picture to burn". About.com found the song's theme to be feminism.

Critical reception
The song was critically acclaimed. Chris Neal of Country Weekly believed "Picture to Burn", along with "Should've Said No", were the most immediately striking songs on Taylor Swift. Billboard lauded the song as "a totally infectious slice of fun with a singalong chorus that you won't be able to dismiss from your memory bank". Jack Lowe of About.com said the song was fun, and that females would specially enjoy it. Kate Kiefer of Paste magazine selected the track as one of Swift's six best singles, and stated, "She really shows her age in this one". Roger Holland of PopMatters commented that the song was the epitome of how, according to him, Swift was more given in uptempo tempos, and that it served as indication to the nature of Swift's debut album. Holland added, "'Picture to Burn' is two parts Ashlee Simpson to one part Amy Dalley, with an overly familiar guitar melody that could have been lifted directly from the latter." Top music critic Robert Christgau selected "Picture to Burn" as a highlight on Taylor Swift.

Josh Love of The Village Voice attributed the song to be one of the reasons how the singer rose to stardom. He called it a "bluntly relatable composition [...] that connected [Swift] with teens from across the spectrum." Patrick McDonald of The Seattle Times called it a "clever, sassy, upbeat song" Alison Bonaguro of the Chicago Tribune said the song was a "clean-but-still-rowdy" number for Swift. Kevin Courtney of The Irish Times mentioned "Picture to Burn" among powerful revenge songs and noted the lyric "Go and tell your friends that I'm obsessive and crazy / That's fine / I'll tell mine you're gay" (a lyric later changed in subsequent releases of the song to the less inflammatory "you won't mind if I say"). He supported the sentiment behind the song and wrote, "You go girl".

Commercial performance
In the United States, "Picture to Burn" peaked at number 28 on the Billboard Hot 100 chart dated May 17, 2008, and spent 20 weeks in total on the chart. The single was certified double platinum by the Recording Industry Association of America (RIAA) in 2014, denoting two million copies based on sales and streaming. By November 2017, "Picture to Burn" had sold 1.7 million digital copies in the United States. On the Hot Country Songs chart, it was the fourth consecutive top-ten single from Swift's debut album, peaking at number three. It spent a total of 20 weeks on Hot Country Songs. In Canada, the single peaked at number 48 on the Canadian Hot 100 chart dated May 3, 2008. It was certified gold by Music Canada for sales of 40,000 digital downloads.

Music video
Trey Fanjoy, who had worked with Swift on past music videos, directed "Picture to Burn" Swift said they conceptualized the video to be "edgy and comical", departing from the tone of their previous collaborations. Swift herself was styled edgier than usual, sporting clothing, hair, and jewelry she was not accustomed to. She was intended to wear thigh-length boots, but was not able to find a pair to correspond with her height. Instead, her stylist sewed black fabric to strap onto black high heels to give the illusion of thigh-length boots. The video's plot was conjectured to involve rampaging and seeking revenge on her ex-boyfriend. Swift chose football player Justin Sandy to portray her ex-boyfriend in the video, believing he had a classic and suspiciously perfect demeanor; she described him as "real life Ken". The video guest-stars Swift's backup band and real-life high school friend Abigail Anderson.

The video was filmed over the course of two days in Nashville, Tennessee. On the first day, performance scenes were filmed inside the Sommet Center, and involved pyrotechnics. Swift was at first nervous about the shoot, as it was her first experience with pyrotechnics. "There are some things I'm nervous about. My hair could very well catch on fire," she said. She was later assured of its safety and explained to about the discrepancy in the distance of the fire in reality than on camera: on camera, it appears to be quite close to her, whereas, in actuality, it was placed far behind her. On the second day, the remaining scenes were filmed at a suburban house in Nashville. Props were provided by the video personnel. On the set, Fanjoy suggested using binoculars for the primary scenes, but Swift disagreed, believing it could come across as "cheesy". She ultimately accepted the idea after Fanjoy explained how it would translate on camera.

The video premiered on March 14, 2008, on AOL's The Boot. It commences with Swift and Anderson in a car parked behind a tree. Swift reminiscences, looking at a photograph of her and her ex-boyfriend together, calling him "a jerk". Anderson is then seen ogling outside the window with binoculars, and spots Swift's ex-boyfriend and another woman arriving in a pick-up truck. Discovering this, Swift states angrily he never allowed her to drive the truck. As Swift's ex-boyfriend and the woman start frolicking inside the truck, the music begins and the video transcends to a concrete room where Swift (clothed in a grey, one-shoulder mini-dress and black leather, thigh-length boots) is playing an electric guitar, alongside her backup band. During the refrain fire ignites behind them. Afterwards, the band is depicted entering a house furtively, using flashlights. Swift is sitting on a brown couch, sporting a black tank top, black leather pants and a beehive hairdo, as the band ransacks the house. The ex-boyfriend and the woman are shown approaching the house, and, seeing this, Anderson informs Swift and the band via a walkie-talkie. He enters the house and discovers it was ransacked. The video concludes with Swift and Anderson leaving the spot, with the photograph of Swift and her ex-boyfriend in flames, thrown in the sidewalk.

Accolades

Live performances

"Picture to Burn" was part of Swift's set lists as the opening act to Brad Paisley's 2007 tour and Rascal Flatts's 2008 tour. While promoting her debut album, Swift sang "Picture to Burn" on October 10, 2007, on Regis & Kelly. She then performed the song at a concert at the Apple Store in SoHo, New York, which was recorded and released as a live extended play (EP), iTunes Live from SoHo, exclusively sold through the iTunes Store. Commencing promotion for it in early and mid-2008, Swift performed "Picture to Burn" on Studio 330 Sessions, Good Morning America, the 2008 CMT Music Awards, and Nashville Star. Since completing promotion for Taylor Swift and its corresponding singles, the singer has performed the song on Clear Channel Communications's Stripped, at the 2009 CMA Music Festival, at the 2009 V Festival, and at the Australian charity concert Sydney Sound Relief.

Swift performed "Picture to Burn" to close the main set, before commencing the encore on all venues of her first headlining concert tour, the Fearless Tour (2009–10). During 2009 performances, Swift donned a black cocktail dress with sparkly ornaments along the stomach, as she roamed throughout the stage, which was projected with images of searing flames, singing the song. In the 2010 extension, Swift bared a spangly, violet mini-dress. Jim Harrington of the San Jose Mercury News believed "Picture to Burn"'s performance on April 11, 2010  at the HP Pavilion in San Jose, California demonstrated how versatile Swift was as a performer, feeling equally at gusto with tender ballads and uptempo rockers. Of the performance at the tour's final concert on June 5, 2010, at Gillette Stadium in Foxborough, Massachusetts, Jay N. Miller of The Patriot Ledger said, "She strutted down the catwalk chastising another hapless ex-boyfriend". Attending the same concert, Molly Trust of Billboard deemed the performance one of the most energized moments of the night, while Susan McDonald of The Sun Chronicle deemed it simple, yet the most powerful.

Credits and personnel
Credits are adapted from the liner notes of Taylor Swift (2006).

 Nathan Chapman – producing, additional engineering, acoustic guitar, electric guitar, harmony vocals
 Chad Carlson – engineering, additional engineering
 Steve Short – assistant engineering
 Chuck Ainlay – mixing
 Scott Kidd – assistant mixing
 Jeff Hyde – banjo
 Tim Marks – bass guitar
 Nick Buda – drum set
 Rob Hajacos – fiddle
 John Willis – mandolin
 Eric Darken – percussion
 Scotty Sanders – steel guitar

Charts

Weekly charts

Year-end charts

Certifications

Release history

References

2008 singles
Music videos directed by Trey Fanjoy
Song recordings produced by Nathan Chapman (record producer)
Songs written by Liz Rose
Songs written by Taylor Swift
Taylor Swift songs
Big Machine Records singles
Songs based on actual events
2006 songs
Country rock songs
Self-censorship